The following is a list of presidents of Morelia Municipality in the state of Michoacán, Mexico. The municipality includes the city of Morelia.

List of officials

 Rafael García de León, 1951-1952 
 Enrique Bravo Valencia, 1953 
 Alfonso Martínez Serrano, 1954-1956 
 Esteban Figueroa Ojeda, 1957-1959 
 Alberto Cano Díaz, 1960-1962 
 Fernando Ochoa Ponce de León, 1963-1965 
 Alfonso Martínez Serrano, 1966-1968 
 Melchor Díaz Rubio, 1969-1970 
 Socorro Navarro, 1970-1971 
 Marco Antonio Aguilar Cortés, 1972-1974 
 Ignacio Gálvez Rocha, 1975-1977 
 , 1978-1980 
 Rafael Ruiz Béjar, 1981-1983 
 , 1984-1986 
 Germán Ireta Alas, 1987-1989 
 , 1990-1992 
 Sergio Magaña Martínez, 1993 
 Fausto Vallejo, 1993–1995, 2002–2004, 2008–2011 
 Salvador López Orduña, 1996–1998, 2005-2007 
 Salvador Galván Infante, 1999-2001 
 Augusto Caire Arriaga, 2001 (interim) 
 María del Rocío Pineda Gochi, 2011 
 Tiznado Manuel Nocetti, 2012 (provisional)  
 Wilfrido Lázaro Medina, 2013-2015 
 Salvador Abud Mirabent, 2015 (interim) 
 Alfonso Martínez Alcázar, 2015-2018 
 Raúl Morón Orozco, 2018-current

See also

References

Morelia
Politicians from Michoacán
History of Michoacán
Municipal presidents